The Daniel Basset House is a historic house at 1024 Monroe Turnpike in Monroe, Connecticut.  Built in 1775, the house is significant for its association with events in the American Revolutionary War.  It is documented to have hosted a ball for French officers of Lauzun's Legion on June 30, 1781; the legion had been encamped near the village center of Monroe.  The house was listed on the National Register of Historic Places in 2002.

Description and history
The Daniel Basset House is located northeast of the village center of Monroe, on the east side of Monroe Turnpike in front of Masuk High School.  It is a -story wood-frame structure set on almost  of land, five bays wide, with two brick chimneys and a side gable roof.  Its centered entrance is flanked by sidelight windows and pilasters, and  topped by a transom window.  The second floor extends slightly over the first floor on the front (west-facing) facade.  The interior follows a central hall plan.  A key feature is a large chamber on the second floor which likely served as a ballroom.

The house was built in 1775. In the summer of 1781, the French army led by the comte de Rochambeau marched across Connecticut, en route to Virginia and the eventual Siege of Yorktown. The bulk of Rochambeau's army took an east–west route which passed north of Monroe, eventually encamping at Newtown, and then marching through Ridgefield toward New York City. This unit camped near the village center of Monroe on June 30. That evening, a ball was held in this house in honor of the French forces. It was to be the last entertainment for the troops, which needed to be on heightened alert as they approached British-held New York City.

See also
March Route of Rochambeau's army
List of historic sites preserved along Rochambeau's route
National Register of Historic Places listings in Fairfield County, Connecticut

References

Houses on the National Register of Historic Places in Connecticut
Houses completed in 1775
Monroe, Connecticut
Houses in Fairfield County, Connecticut
Historic places on the Washington–Rochambeau Revolutionary Route
National Register of Historic Places in Fairfield County, Connecticut
Buildings and structures in Monroe, Connecticut